Sari Daraq (also Romanized as Sārī Daraq) is a village in Ani Rural District, in the Central District of Germi County, Ardabil Province, Iran. At the 2006 census, its population was 162, in 25 families.

References 

Towns and villages in Germi County